The Last Two Days is a 2021 Malayalam language thriller film directed by Santhosh Lakshman. It was released on 27 May 2021 through the OTT platform NeeStream.

Cast
 Deepak Parambol
 Dharmajan Bolgatty
 Nandhan Unni
 Harikrishnan
 Vineeth Mohan
 Aditi Ravi
 Major Ravi
 Murali Gopi
 Ajmal Zayn

References

External links

2021 films
2021 thriller films
2020s Malayalam-language films
Indian thriller films
Films not released in theaters due to the COVID-19 pandemic